Södingberg is a former municipality in the district of Voitsberg in the Austrian state of Styria. Since the 2015 Styria municipal structural reform, it is part of the municipality Geistthal-Södingberg.

Geography
Södingberg lies west of Graz.

References

Cities and towns in Voitsberg District